Mike Minogue is a New Zealand television and film actor. He plays Officer Minogue in the television series, Wellington Paranormal.

Minogue is currently a Co-Host on Radio Hauraki's Big Show, 4pm to 7pm Weekdays, alongside fellow New Zealand actor and radio DJ, Jason Hoyte.

Biography 
Minogue grew up in Levin, New Zealand and was educated at St Joseph's Primary School and Horowhenua College.

He worked in the production side of the film industry on a number of films including The Lord of the Rings: The Return of the King, The Hobbit trilogy, District 9, The Adventures of Tintin and Avatar before auditioning for a role in Separation City.

He auditioned for a part in the 2014 film What We Do in the Shadows. Minogue played Officer Minogue in the film and continued the same role in the spin-off television series Wellington Paranormal, until the shows finale, which aired in 2022. He won a New Zealand Television Award for this role in 2019.

He also played the role of a hunter in Hunt For The Wilderpeople.

Minogue developed and starred in web/TV series The Water Cooler in 2016. He has also produced a number of short films.

Filmography

References

External links

Year of birth missing (living people)
Living people
New Zealand male television actors
People from Levin, New Zealand
People educated at Horowhenua College